WWT Arundel is one of ten wildfowl and wetland nature reserves managed by the Wildfowl and Wetlands Trust, a nature conservation charity in the United Kingdom. The  reserve is situated at the foot of the Offham Hangar, a part of the Arun valley in Arundel, West Sussex, England.

One of the endangered species protected at the centre is the Hawaiian goose, or nēnē, the rarest goose in the world, and state bird of Hawaii. Many species of duck, goose and swan can be seen at the reserve.

The centre provides a variety of habitats from around the world for its various 'residents' such as its Coastal Creek aviary exhibit with cut-away diving tank. Visitors can watch sea ducks like long-tailed ducks and Spectacled eiders dive for fish. The Pelican Cove exhibit is home to four female Dalmatian Pelicans with daily Meet the Keeper talks. 

With eight wildlife hides situated all over the site, visitors can get close up views to wildlife including nesting kingfishers and sand martins in spring. The site is noted for its summer wildflowers and roosting marsh harriers in winter. 

Also available each day are Boat Safari rides through reedbed habitats, driven by WWT wildlife guides. The centre is open all year except for Christmas day.

Species
Species from other countries are not wild.

Mute swan
Northern shoveler
Ferruginous duck
Common pochard
Red-crested pochard
Eurasian wigeon
Tufted duck
Long-tailed duck

Captive
Common scoter
Australian wood duck
Red-breasted goose
Hawaiian goose (nēnē)
Marbled duck
Bufflehead duck
Carolina wood duck
White-headed duck
Dalmatian pelican
Spectacled eider
Avocets
Redshank
Bewick's swan pair
Orinocco goose
Trumpeter swan pair
Scaly-sided merganser
Black-necked grebe

Wild
Moorhen
Coot
Mallard
Kingfisher
Teal
Canada goose
Common shelduck
Greylag goose
Common gull
Rock dove
Woodpigeon
Common pheasant
Great tit
Blue tit
Common chaffinch
Robin
Carrion crow
Water vole
Reed warbler
Sedge warbler
Cetti's warbler
Oystercatcher
Sand martins
Gadwall

References

External links

 Official website

Environment of West Sussex
Arundel
Arun District
Nature centres in England
Nature reserves in West Sussex